Helena Božić (born 14 February 1997) is a Montenegrin footballer who plays as a defender for Åland United and the Montenegro women's national team.

Career
Božić has been capped for the Montenegro national team, appearing for the team during the 2019 FIFA Women's World Cup qualifying cycle.

References

External links
 Helena Božić at Football Association of Montenegro
 
 

1997 births
Living people
Montenegrin women's footballers
Montenegro women's international footballers
Women's association football defenders
ŽNK Mura players
Åland United players
Kansallinen Liiga players
Montenegrin expatriate sportspeople in Serbia
Expatriate women's footballers in Serbia
Montenegrin expatriate sportspeople in Albania
Montenegrin expatriate sportspeople in Slovakia
Expatriate women's footballers in Slovakia
Montenegrin expatriate sportspeople in Slovenia
Expatriate women's footballers in Slovenia
Montenegrin expatriate sportspeople in Finland
Expatriate women's footballers in Finland